is the collective term for a class of indigenous martial arts from the Nusantara and surrounding geocultural areas of Southeast Asia. It is traditionally practised in Brunei, Indonesia, Malaysia, Singapore, Southern Thailand, Southern Philippines and Southern Vietnam. Hundreds of styles and schools tend to focus either on strikes, joint manipulation, weaponry, or some combination thereof.

The word  is used by Malay-speaking countries throughout Southeast Asia, but is officially called  in Indonesia. The term  was adopted globally in reference to  being performed as professional competitive sport, similar to wushu.

 is one of the sports included in the Southeast Asian Games (SEA Games) and other region-wide competitions.  first made its debut in the 1987 Southeast Asian Games and 2018 Asian Games, both of which were held in Indonesia. Training halls are overseen by separate national organisations in each of the main countries where the art is practised. Practitioners are called .

 is one of the  styles. The term  ("Malay silat") is used in reference to the  systems in the Riau Archipelago and Johor.  is often associated with fixed hand positions, low stances and slow dance-like movements. While this generalisation does not necessarily reflect the reality of  techniques, it had a notable influence on the stereotypical way the art is portrayed in Brunei, Indonesia, Malaysia, and Singapore.

Etymology

The origin of the word silat is uncertain. The Malay term silat is linked to the Minangkabau word silek, thus a Sumatran origin of the term is likely. It possibly related to silambam, the Tamil martial art that has been recorded as practiced in Malaysia since at least the fifteenth century in Malacca. According to Malaysian source, the word 'silat' originates from the Arabic word 'silah' (سِلَاح) meaning 'weapon' or 'silah' (صِلَةُ) meaning 'connection'. The most popular theory in Malaysia is that it derives from sekilat meaning "as (fast as) lightning".

Other theories derive silat from the Sanskrit śīla meaning morality or principle, or the Southern Chinese saula which means to push or perform with the hands. The Sanskrit theory is particularly popular in Thailand, as sila is an alternate form of the word silat in that country. Another possibility is si elat, which means someone who confuses, deceives or bluffs. A similar term, ilat, means an accident, misfortune or calamity. Yet another similar-sounding word is silap meaning wrong or error. Some styles contain techniques called Langkah Silap designed to lead the opponent into making a mistake.

In its proper usage in the languages of its origin, silat is often a general term for any fighting style. This is still common in Indonesia where in some regions both silat and kuntau are traditionally interchangeable.

History

Legend
Stories detail the history of particular styles, which are often used as silat origin stories. One such tale is of a woman named Rama Sukana who witnessed a fight between a tiger and a large hawk. By using the animals' movements, she was able to fend off a group of drunken men who attacked her. She then taught the techniques to her husband, Rama Isruna, from whom they formally passed down. There are several variations of this story across the region. On Bawean, Rama Sukana is believed to have watched monkeys fighting each other, while the Sundanese of West Java believe that she saw a monkey battle a tiger.

The legend in the Malay Peninsula is that the heroine is named Teemoh. The daughter of a raja in the Langkasuka , her husband is a possessive man named Uma. Teemoh tries to scare away a white-rumped shama or murai batu (more than one in some versions) that flies at her as she bathes. With each move the bird makes, she attempts to wave it off with her hands, and spins as it flies around her. Rather than fighting off drunken men, Teemoh fends off her husband who tries to beat her for taking so long. The fact that this legend attributes silat to a woman reflects the prominence of women in Southeast Asian society, as can be seen in the matriarchal adat perpatih customs of West Sumatra. The exploits of Malay warriors are prominently featured in many classical Malay texts. The Hikayat Hang Tuah epic literature tells the stories of Hang Tuah and his four companions, who with their exceptional skill in martial arts and warfare, rose in fame to become the Malacca's foremost Hulubalang. The text recounts arguably the most famous silat duel in literature, that is kris-fighting between Hang Tuah and one of his companions, Hang Jebat.

Another legend tells of three Minangkabau warriors from West Sumatra. By their masters' instruction, the young men were travelling north in the hope of attaining moksha (enlightenment). On their journey, they are caught in a bloody battle near the Thai border. One of the three is wounded but escapes into a forest. Following a stream, he reaches a waterfall where he rests. The warrior notices a lotus flower come down the waterfall but even as it is pushed below the surface by the waterfall, the lotus reemerges completely intact. The warrior tries throwing a stone and then a stick at the lotus, with the same result. Finally he goes into the water and tries slashing at it with his sword, but the lotus only swirls away unharmed. The exhausted warrior then falls into the water and upon climbing out, he contemplates how this principle of overcoming the hard with the soft could be applied to battle. He creates a method of silat with two compatriots. This story is often told in the Malay Peninsula either as the origin of a particular lineage or to explain the spread of silat from the Minangkabau heartland into mainland Southeast Asia. A Minangkabau-style silat called silek minang influenced the style of Silat in Negeri Sembilan in the Malay Peninsula.

The time period for this tale is generally believed to be the 14th century. However, a later version with a more Islamic setting places it in the 17th century. In this version, the three men are named Burhanuddin, Shamsuddin and Aminuddin. Rather than a quest for enlightenment, they journey to Aceh where Islam has recently been introduced in order to learn more about the religion. Their status as warriors is not mentioned. Instead, Burhanuddin is filling a water jar when he sees the lotus blossom. He then thought he heard a voice from the tree telling him to teach others what he learned. Upon returning home, each of the three men became religious teachers. This version links it with Burhanuddin Ulakan, a Minangkabau man who studied in Aceh and became the first Muslim preacher in West Sumatra.

Early period

The silat tradition is mostly oral. In the absence of written records, much of its history is known through myth and archaeological evidence. It is believed that this form of martial arts developed around the developments of Bukit Siguntang Mahameru kingdom in Palembang, Sumatra, Indonesia. As narrated in the Malay Annals, the beginning of the Sumatran empire, started with a story of Paduka Demang Lebar Daun and Sang Nila Utama which took place in Batang Musi River. Paduka Demang Lebar Daun was officially styled as the forefather (Mangkubumi) of the Nusantara peoples in Malay archipelago by Sang Nila Utama through their oath. From the Bukit Siguntang Kingdom it developed into three full-grown empires in Malay history. One of them is the Pagaruyung Kingdom (West Sumatra, Indonesia) under the rule of King Adityawarman around the 12th century.

In Nusantara the genesis of traditional martial arts is attributed to the need for self-defense, hunting techniques and military training. Hand-to-hand combat and weapons practice were important in training warriors for combat. Early traditional fighting styles are v believed to have been developed among various Malay tribes from the dawn of Malay civilisation. These early fighting styles epitomize the movements of animals such as the crocodile, tiger and eagle, and was deeply influenced by ancient Austronesian animism. The expanding Iron Age civilisations on Mainland Southeast Asia engaged in wars and diplomacy led to the advancement of the art of war, weaponry and martial arts skills.

Early Nusantarans and the related Chams were the only sizable Austronesians who had established themselves since the Iron Age on mainland Southeast Asia among the Austroasiatic inhabitants. Scholars such as Hall and Blust argued that the earlier Funanese were Austronesians, and by the early Christian era, a single dialect chain of Austronesian languages extended almost unbroken from the Malay peninsula to Champa. The expansion of the Khmers into the Mekong Delta would have divided an earlier language continuum into two separate dialects. The earliest weapons found in the Malay Archipelago were sharpened stone tools such as axes. Influence from Laos, Vietnam, India, and Southern China arrived during the Neolithic period. Whole communities from Southern China were transferred to Southeast Asia, bringing their weapons and weapon-making technology with them. It is probable that these communities already exercised some form of systematisation over the use of these weapons when they arrived in the 2nd and 3rd century BCE. The early Austronesian settlements that centered around present day Southern Vietnam and the Kra Isthmus region of the Malay peninsula and its peripheries, developed into strong kingdoms including Champa, Langkasuka and Kedah. The Chams were known as formidable warriors. Their skills in warfare were gained through long intermittent conflicts with neighbouring kingdoms. Southeast Asian sea-nomads and indigenous Southeastern Chinese boat-dwellers such as the Baiyue and Tanka people have been noted. Examples include long-boat culture, war fleets, tattoos, familiarity with plant poisons, and bladed weaponry. The Baiyue adopted the use of bronze from northern China and in turn introduced it to Tonkin and Vietnam, resulting in the Đông Sơn culture of the Bronze Age. From Dongson this technology spread to Java in the Indonesian Archipelago, producing steel weapons such as broadswords, spears, and knives The discovery of prototypes of bronze kris in Southern Vietnam, with hilt decorated by human figures, dating back more than 2000 years, further indicated that the Chams had developed an advanced martial arts tradition. The iconic kris was patterned after the Dongson dagger. Even centuries later, their martial prowess was held in high regard among Malays and Sumatrans, as the legends of prominent Cham warriors appeared in Malay Annals and Tambo of Minangkabau people. Tambo for example, recounts the legend of Cham warrior Harimau Campo ('tiger of Champa’). Together with Kucieng Siam, Kambiang Hutan and Anjiang Mualim, they developed the early Minangkabau silek.

Early Nusantarans and the related Chams, were the only sizable Austronesians that had established themselves since the Iron Age on the Mainland Southeast Asia among the Austroasiatic inhabitants. Some scholars like Hall and Blust argued that even the earlier Funanese were Austronesians, and by the early centuries of Christian era, a single dialect chain of Austronesian languages would have extended almost unbroken from the Malay peninsula to Champa. The expansion of the Khmers into the region of the Mekong Delta would then have divided an earlier language continuum into two separate and smaller dialects. The earliest weapons found in the Malay Archipelago were sharpened stone tools such as axes. Influence from Laos, Vietnam, India, and Southern China arrived during the Neolithic period. Whole communities from Southern China were transferred to Southeast Asia, bringing their weapons and weapon-making technology with them. It is probable that these communities already exercised some form of systematisation over the use of these weapons when they arrived in the 2nd and 3rd century BCE. The early Austronesian settlements that centered around present day Southern Vietnam and the Kra Isthmus region of Malay peninsula and its peripheries, had developed into strong kingdoms like Champa, Langkasuka and Kedah. The Chams were particularly known as formidable warriors who were great exponents of martial arts. Their exceptional skills in warfare were gained through their long intermittent conflicts with neighbouring kingdoms. Similarities have been observed between Southeast Asian sea-nomads and indigenous Southeastern Chinese boat-dwellers such as the Baiyue and Tanka people. Examples include the long-boat culture, war fleets, tattoos, familiarity with plant poisons, and bladed weaponry. The Baiyue adopted the use of bronze from northern China and in turn introduced it to Tonkin and Vietnam, resulting in the Đông Sơn culture of the Bronze Age. From Dongson this technology spread to Java in the Indonesian Archipelago thus producing steel weapons such as broadswords, spears, and knives. The discovery of prototypes of bronze kris in Southern Vietnam, with hilt decorated by human figure, dating back to more than 2000 years ago, further indicated that the Chams had developed an advanced martial arts tradition. The iconic kris was patterned after the Dongson dagger. Even centuries later, their martial prowess were still held in high regards among people in Malay peninsula and Sumatra, as the legends of prominent Cham warriors made its way in the Malay Annals and Tambo of Minangkabau people. Tambo for example, recounts the legend of a Cham warrior who goes by the name Harimau Campo ('tiger of Champa’). Together with Kucieng Siam, Kambiang Hutan and Anjiang Mualim, they developed the early Minangkabau silek.

Since Islamization in the 1980s and 90s in Malaysia, participants have attempted to make silat more compliant with Muslim beliefs and practices. Many instructors justify this by creating histories to tie their style with Islam and distance themselves from traditional folklore. Some Malaysian silat schools go so far as refusing to teach non-Muslims, or to perform at non-Muslim weddings. This has given rise to various misconceptions that Silat is inherently Muslim or can only be practised by followers of the Islamic faith. In actuality, the Hindu-Buddhist and animistic roots of the art were never eradicated, and remain very evident even among Muslim practitioners. As a result of this modern trend, many traditional practices and styles have become increasingly rare. It is now illegal for Muslim practitioners in Malaysia to chant mantra, bow to idols, or attempt to acquire supernatural powers. Traditional meditation is sometimes also discouraged or altered, and the incantations spoken before training or during massage are now often replaced with prayer recitation.

Foreign influence
An important development of martial arts of the Nusantara is also attributed to foreign influence. The infusion of foreign elements was obtained through wars and conquests and through trade and diplomacy. The growth in trade relations brought foreign influence throughout the primordial Austronesian ancient states, most importantly in cultural traits including the combative arts. The influence from Chinese and Indian martial arts can be observed from the use of weapons such as the Indian mace and the Chinese sword. During this period, formalised combat arts were believed to have been practiced in the Champa, Malay peninsula and Sumatra. From the 12th century, martial arts were further developed in Langkasuka under Srivijaya after the Chola Empire was expelled from Sumatra and the Malay Peninsula. The Riau Archipelago is noted for its role in the development of Malay martial arts. Its Orang Laut people, also called Orang Selat, are stereotyped as sea pirates, but historically played major roles in the times of Srivijaya and later sultanates of Malacca, and Johor. The fighting styles developed in this area are described as a prototype of Malay martial arts and one of the progenitors of modern Malay Silat.

The influence of the Indian subcontinent and Southern China were fundamental to the development of Silat. By adopting the Indian faiths of Hinduism and Buddhism, Southeast Asian social structure became more organised. Images of Hindu figures such as Durga, Krishna and scenes from the Ramayana all bear testament to the Indian influence on local weapons and armour. Forms are said to have been introduced by Buddhist monk Bodhidharma, born in Central Asia or India (5th or 6th century CE), who came to Southeast Asia via the Srivijayan capital of Palembang. Many of Silat'''s medicinal practices and weapons originated in either India or China. The slapping actions in Silat jurus (in which the practitioner slaps their own body) are reminiscent of Indian martial arts. Some form of wrestling is indeed portrayed in Indonesian temple art. The martial arts practised by the Chinese community of Southeast Asia are referred to as kuntao.

The Book of Liang mentions a kingdom called Poling or Poli southeast of Guangdong. Thought to be located in the Malay Peninsula, the people of this kingdom are said to have customs identical with Cambodia and the same produce as Siam. Their weapons are purportedly the same as China's with the exception of the chakram with which locals are said to be highly skilled.

Folklore credits the promulgation of Silat to pendeta or Hindu-Buddhist sages, often through the study of animals and the natural world. The priests were said to combine the animal movements with meditative postures (semadi) and mystic hand positions (mudra), much like the kuji-in of ninjutsu. The animal-based concept was most likely adopted from Indian martial arts. Village shamans or dukun would often learn Silat as part of their craft and for defending themselves while travelling. Bomoh in some communities such as the Kadayan are required to complete training in Silat before they are initiated. Silat is an integral aspect of healing rituals such as puteri. Through this connection, Silat is used as a method of spiritual training in addition to self-defense. Systems exist that focus exclusively on the internal rather than the physical.

Nomadic boat-dwellers in Southeast Asia and southeastern China were often misconstrued as pirates for political reasons, but Faxian and Zhao Rugua both described fierce warriors armed with an arsenal of weapons who would attack boats passing around Singapore, Sumatra, Java, and the South China Sea. Local rulers like Parameswara relied on the boat-people to maintain control of their territory. They played a key role in the region's power struggles into the colonial era. Piracy saw an increase after the arrival of European colonists, who recorded Malay pirates armed with sabres, kris and spears across the archipelago into the Gulf of Siam. The Haijin or maritime ban in Ming China spurred the migration of Chinese to Southeast Asia. Marooned Cantonese and Hokkien naval officers set up small gangs for protection along river estuaries and recruited local Silat practitioners as foot soldiers known as lang or lanun (Malay for pirate). Chinese pirates like Liang Daoming and Chen Zuyi became so successful that they became leaders. Whether pirates or not, Southeast Asia's boat people were crucial to the accumulation of weapons and techniques in Silat. Through their journeys they acquired weapons from across the region, came into contact with other fighting styles, and spread Silat into Brunei.

Southeast Asian trade extended into Okinawa and Japan by the 15th century. The number of Japanese people travelling the region increased after the Battle of Sekigahara. By the early 17th century small Japanese communities were living and trading in Indochina. Some arrived with the official red seal ships while others were warriors and pirates from the losing side of the Sekigahara war. Although mostly confined to Siam, some Japanese traveled to Cambodia and Indonesia after the Ayutthaya Kingdom was attacked by the Burmese.Silat shares many similarities with Okinawan karate as well as the throws and stances of weapon-based Japanese martial arts that date to this time. Trade with Japan ended when the country went into self-imposed isolation, but resumed during the Meiji era, when certain areas of Malaysia, Indonesia and Singapore became home to a small Japanese population. After the Japanese Occupation, some Silat masters incorporated the katana into their systems.

As India came under the rule of conquerors from Central Asia and the Middle East, Indian traders who frequented Southeast Asia introduced knives of Arabian origin to the western coast of Sumatra. Indian-Muslim blades brought a Moorish influence to the shape of local knives, most strongly seen in Aceh. These weapons, sometimes erroneously called "Muslim weaponry", spread into Sulawesi and West Malaysia by the 19th century. The only notable examples of such blades are the jambia and the karis, the latter was a short Acehnese hook-like knife (not to be confused with the indigenous kris).

Weapons

Prior to the introduction of firearms, weapons training was actually considered to be of greater value than unarmed techniques and even today many masters consider a student's training incomplete if they have not learned the use of weapons. Except for some weapon-based styles, students must generally achieve a certain degree of skill before being presented with a weapon which is traditionally made by the guru. This signifies the beginning of weapons-training. Silat uses the principle of applying the same techniques both armed and unarmed, though not quite to the same degree as is done in the Filipino martial arts. Unlike eskrima, Silat does not necessarily emphasise armed combat and practitioners may choose to focus mainly on fighting empty-handed. Advanced students practice unarmed against armed opponents.

Among the hundreds of styles are dozens of weapons. The most commonly used are the staff, broadsword, and various types of knives. Silat today is often associated with the kris or dagger which was traditionally used mainly as a last resort when the fighter had no other weapon available or lost their main weapon in battle. As such, older styles place less importance on the weapon, particularly in Indonesia. However, its significance as a cultural symbol has raised the importance of the kris to such an extent that it has become the primary weapon of many later systems in the Malay Peninsula. Silat's traditional arsenal is largely made up of objects designed for domestic purposes such as the flute (seruling), rope (tali), sickle (sabit) and chain (rantai).

 Training 

Initiation
Certain rituals signify the initiation of a new student. This may include fasting, or drinking herbal tea. ''Silat'' masters traditionally never charged fees for their teaching, but money or some other gift may be offered by an aspiring student. These practices are no longer followed, especially outside Southeast Asia, but are well-preserved in Indonesia.

SalutationSilat practitioners begin and end routines by saluting their teacher, partner or any spectators as a show of respect. The handsign used is dependent on style and lineage. The majority of silat exponents use the Hindu-Buddhist namaste in which the palms are pressed together at chest level, often accompanied by a bow of the head. This represents the balance of two opposing forces represented either by the harimau (tiger, male aspect) and buaya (crocodile, female aspect) or by the nāga (dragon) and garuda (giant eagle). This concept is referred to as jantan betina (male-female) and is equivalent to the androgynous Indian Ardhanarishvara or the Chinese yin and yang. The head or upper body is usually bowed as a sign of humility. This was used as a greeting in ancient times and can still be seen throughout Southeast Asia, especially in Indonesia and Thailand. The practical purpose of the salute is to trigger the proper state of mind for training or fighting. Additionally, it serves as a technique to block attacks aimed at the face.

Some traditional Javanese schools use another handsign, similar to the handsign of the Chinese. In the context of silat, the fist symbolises martial skill while the opposite hand is a sign of courtesy and camaraderie. This is meant to convey mutual respect and shows that the fighters are willing to learn from each other. Like namaste it recalls the idea of duality. A few systems, such as Silat Pattani, have their own form of salutation unique to that particular system.

Stances and footwork

Every style incorporates multi-level fighting stances (sikap pasang), or preset postures meant to provide the foundation for stability while in motion. The horse stance is the most essential posture, common to many Asian martial arts. Beginners once had to practice this stance for long periods, as many as four hours, but later practitioners train until they can last for at least ten minutes. "step"), a set of structured steps.  consist of basic footwork and kicks made to teach how to best move in a fight. Each  considers the particular move as well as also the potential for change in each movement and action. Altogether, the stances, and  act as a basis for forms-training.

Forms
Their main function is to pass down all of a style's techniques and combat applications in an organised manner, as well as provide physical conditioning and public demonstration. While demonstrating a form, Silat practitioners often use the open hand to slap parts of their own body such as the shoulder, elbow, thigh or knee. This reminds the pesilat that when an opponent comes close there may be an opportunity to trap their attacking limbs. Aside from solo forms, they may be performed with one or more partners. Routines pitting one fighter against several opponents are common in Silat. Partnered forms are useful for teaching the application of techniques, particularly those attacks that are too dangerous to be used in a sparring match.

 (dance) are freestyle
forms that have not been arranged beforehand but are created spontaneously. With a partner,  is used as a way of sensitivity training similar to Chinese chi sao. The aesthetic aspect of forms is called flower ( or ) or art forms. They are performed in slow, graceful movements.

 (dance) are freestyle forms which have not been arranged beforehand but are created spontaneously. With a partner,  is used as a way of sensitivity training similar to Chinese chi sao. The aesthetic aspect of forms is called flower ( or ) or art forms. They are performed in slow, graceful movements with a dance-like quality.

Sparring

Sparring in silat may be done according to official competitive rules with protective gear, or traditionally with no protection. In either case, attacks to vital areas are prohibited. Sparring, as with Silat training in general, was often done in varying conditions to prepare the fighter for combat in any situation. The most common of these was training in dim light, sparring against several opponents, fighting unarmed against an armed opponent, and fighting in darkness or blindfolded. Others include fighting in a tight space (common in Bajau styles), on a slippery surface (as in Minang styles), or from a seated position (a fundamental of Sundanese styles). The defender is attacked by both armed and unarmed opponents. Weapons can be exchanged between the attackers, while the defender is allowed to steal and use the weapons against them. These matches were traditionally full-contact and highly dangerous, but generally became light-contact.

Tests
Advanced silat students undergo ordeals or  meant to test their physical, psychological and spiritual endurance. In former times, these tests were sometimes even used as a way of assessing whether the student is willing to follow the master's instructions. Confidence tests still in use today include putting one's hands in boiling oil and rubbing it onto the body, jumping through a flaming hoop, or catching a spear which is thrown down a waterfall. Some methods are no longer practiced for practical or legal reasons, such as fighting a tiger, meditating in a cemetery, immersing oneself in well water for seven days and nights, or for female students to fight men.

Competition
These are:

Strikes are legal only if they hit between the shoulder line and the waist. Each successful strike is awarded one point.
Hitting the face or below the belt is a penalty.
Throws in themselves are not awarded points, and ground follow-up is permitted.
A joint-lock is awarded 10 points.
Immobilising the opponent by holding them helpless is worth 5 points.

Energy
In Silat culture, the energetic body consists of interlocking circles called cakra. The 's energy rotates outwards along diagonal lines. Energy that emits outwards from the centre line is defensive while offensive energy moves inwards from the sides of the body. The Silat practitioner can harmonise their movements with the cakra, thereby increasing the power and effectiveness of attacks and movements. Folklore describes legendary techniques that allow the fighter to attack from afar using energy alone without physically touching the opponent.

Terms of address
In Indonesia, anyone who teaches silat is generally addressed as Guru or teacher. More specifically in Malay language, instructors who are qualified to teach but haven't yet achieved full mastery are addressed as Cikgu or Chegu. Masters are called Guru while grandmasters are called Mahaguru which means supreme teacher. The terms Cikgu and Guru are typically interchangeable. An elderly male master may be addressed as Tok Guru or Tuk Guru (lit. elderly Guru). The Javanese equivalent of this term is Eyang Guru which may be used for an elderly master or the teacher's master. In all countries where silat is practised, the honorary title of  may be officially bestowed on a master by royalty or unofficially by commoners.

Music

These performances are often displayed during festivities such as weddings or during a royal installation. They can be done either solo or with a partner and are accompanied by music played by a live band. Several traditional dances were influenced by Silat, such as the inai in the Malay Peninsula. Silat is sometimes also performed during the  ceremony and festival by Kangeanese people in the Kangean Islands.

The music played during  performances is known as gendang baku in the Malay Peninsula, and  among the Sunda people of West Java. The kendang are the main (and sometimes only) instrument in Minang silat performances of West Sumatra. The music from the northern part of the Malay Peninsula more closely resembles Thai music.

The  or Suling (flute), which also comes in long and short versions are seen as what gives Silat music its distinct sound.

In popular culture

Film
Silat's appearance in film began in black-and-white Indonesian and Malay movies. Shaw Brothers and Cathay-Kris Studio produced more than 40 popular titles featuring Silat in Malaysia during the 1950s–1960s. Famous examples from this period include Tiger from Tjampa (1953), Panglima Besi, Seri Mersing, Musang Berjanggut (1959), Hang Jebat, Serikandi, and Malaysia's first colour movie, Hang Tuah (1956). While Silat was featured in all these films for the purpose of the plot, depiction of the art was not a priority. What was shown was essentially silat wayang, designed for stage performances. Very little choreography was arranged beforehand and they were never promoted as either action or martial art movies. Accordingly, actors at the time usually had no prior training in Silat, resulting in what are generally poor depictions.

Silat later became increasingly prominent in Indonesian movies during the 1970s, resulting in more professional and authentic depictions of the art in both historical and action movies. Indonesian action stars Ratno Timoer and Advent Bangun were famous in the 1980s films that depicted Silat such as The Devil's Sword and Malaikat Bayangan. In Malaysia, Silat became increasingly rare on-screen during subsequent decades. After 2000, Silat was featured to varying degrees of importance in popular Malay movies such as Pontianak Harum Sundal Malam (2004), Gong (2006), Orang Minyak (2007), KL Gangster (2011) and Jiwa Taiko (2012). Other notable instances of authentic Silat in film include:
 Puteri Gunung Ledang, Malaysia's first big-budget movie, featured two highly publicised fights choreographed by a Silat exponent. Upon the film's release these scenes were not well-received, with reviewers criticising the battles as badly-choreographed, too short, and generally over-hyped.
 The 2009 Indonesian film Merantau showcased Silek Harimau, one of the oldest Silat systems in existence. The film had a positive reaction from critics and is credited with reviving Indonesia's martial arts in film. The movie generated enough interest for the film's director and lead actor to follow up with The Raid: Redemption in 2011 which received international acclaim. Its sequel The Raid 2: Berandal was similarly well-received but drew criticism for its graphic violence, and was banned from a theatrical release in Malaysia.
The 2014 Indonesian movie The Golden Cane Warrior helped revive interest in the historical Silat genre (cerita silat) which had become dormant in film.
The 2014 Brunei movie Yasmine is about a teenage female protagonist who learns Silat.
The 2016 American film The Accountant features the main character being trained in and using silat.
The 2018 Indonesian movie Wiro Sableng 212 also revived the historical Silat genre.

Television

Period dramas that feature Silat have been a common staple of Indonesian television for many decades, typically supplemented by wire-work and/or CG effects. In Malaysia, this genre is said to have reached its peak during the 1990s when directors like Uwei Shaari strove to depict Silat in its original form by casting martial artists rather than actors. Series from that period includes Keris Lok Tujuh, Pendekar: Bayangan Harta and Keris Hitam Bersepuh Emas. These are still regarded as the country's best costume dramas before the genre began to decline in Malaysia after the early 2000s. Aside from period dramas, authentic Silat is often featured in other genres, such as the Indonesian series Mawar Merah and the made-for-TV children's movie Borobudur. In Malaysia, various styles of Silat are regularly showcased in martial arts-themed documentary serials like Mahaguru, Gelanggang and Gerak Tangkas. The Discovery Channel's series Fight Quest showcased pencak Silat in Bandung, Indonesia in one of its episodes.

Literature

Silat in the literary tradition can be traced to the old hikayat or epics that became popular as literacy spread among Southeast Asian people, specifically from the Malay Peninsula beginning around the 8th-13th century. Stories such as Hikayat Inderajaya and Hikayat Hang Tuah from Malaysia, focus on legendary or semi-historical martial artists.

In Indonesia, this tradition has continued into modern times in the form of historical Silat novels or cerita Silat, equivalent to the Chinese wuxia genre. Notable authors include Bastian Tito, Kho Ping Ho and S.H. Mintardja whose popular books have been adapted into period-dramas for television such as Wira Sableng and Naga Sasra Sabuk Intan. While this genre is nearly unknown in Malaysia, Silat does sometimes feature in Malay novels and anthologies set during the Malacca Sultanate era. Outside Asia, Silat was referenced in Tom Clancy's Net Force by Steve Perry, although the books give a fictionalized portrayal of the art.

Comics
The earliest instance of Silat in graphic novels are found in Indonesian comics of the 1960s that typically featured heroes who were expert martial artists. The titles Si Buta Dari Gua Hantu, Jaka Sembung, Panji Tengkorak and Walet Merah all gave rise to popular films in the 1970s and 1980s. Indonesian action star Barry Prima made a name for himself portraying the character in the 1981 film Jaka Sembung. Silat is also featured in Malaysian comics, but is not known as having a large audience. Outside Southeast Asia, Silat has been featured in Japanese manga titles Kenichi: The Mightiest Disciple and Kengan Omega.

Indonesian radio shows of the 1980s, many of them historical dramas, concerned the adventures of martial artists in Hindu-Buddhist kingdoms of medieval Java and Sumatra. The most notable was Saur Sepuh, Tutur Tinular and its sequel Mahkota Mayangkara. Each programme was highly successful in their home country, and continued to spawn films and television series.

 Video games 

Silat was featured in the video game Mortal Kombat: Deception (2004) and Mortal Kombat: Armageddon'' (2006) as an exclusive fighting style for Baraka.

See also

 Pencak Silat
 Silat Harimau
 Silambam
 Silat Melayu
 Kuntao
 Styles of silat
 Weapons of silat

References

Further reading
 
 DeMarco, M. (2010). "Practical Fighting Strategies of Indonesian Kuntao-Silat in the Willem Reeders Tradition"
 Sarina Md. Yusof, Suhana Aiman and Norlizah Abdul Hamid (2005). Physiological Profile of Malaysian Silat Olahraga Athletes. Institute of Research, Development and Commercialisation (BRC), Universiti Teknologi MARA, Malaysia, Project file no.: 600-FSR (5/2)27.

External links

Indonesian martial arts

fr:Silat